Double Target is a 1987 film directed by Bruno Mattei. The film starts with terrorists who attack American military bases in several Southeast Asian states. Ex-GI Bob Ross is smuggled into Vietnam by the CIA, where he is supposed to put the masterminds of the attacks out of action. In return, the secret service frees Bob's son who was born there from a re-education camp and brings him home to America. After heavy fighting with Viet Cong soldiers and Russian special forces, Ross also returns victorious to the United States.

The film was released theatrically in West Germany as Der Kampfgigant in 1987.

Release
Double Target was released theatrically in West Germany on June 11, 1987. It was later released in the United Kingdom on the home video label Avatar in August 1987 as Double Target.

Reception
From contemporary reviews, the German film almanac Fischer Film Almanach stated that the film was another hybrid of the other bad Vietnam-themed films made after Rambo. In a retrospective review, Daniel R. Budnik wrote in his book on 1980s action films that Double Target is "entertaining but a little too long" and that the film "alternates between Sense and No Sense, the way many Mattei films do."

References

Sources

External links
 
 Double Target at Variety Distribution

1987 films
Vietnam War films
Films directed by Bruno Mattei
1980s Italian-language films
English-language Italian films
1980s English-language films
1987 multilingual films
Italian multilingual films